Ben Gledhill (born 18 September 1989) is an English rugby league footballer who played for Wakefield Trinity and Salford of Super League. Gledhill was an academy player at Castleford Tigers before joining Wakefield Trinity.

In 2013, he switched to play rugby union for Darlington RFC, then in April 2015 returned to play rugby league for Shaw Cross Sharks ARLFC.

References

External links
(archived by web.archive.org) New signing in 19-man squad
Statistics at rugbyleagueproject.org

1989 births
Living people
Darlington RFC players
English rugby league players
English rugby union players
Featherstone Rovers players
Rugby league props
Salford Red Devils players
Wakefield Trinity players